Wavy Navy is a video game designed by Rodney McAuley for the Apple II and published by Sirius Software in 1983. Atari 8-bit family and Commodore 64 versions were released the same year. Wavy Navy is a nautically themed fixed shooter with left and right controls to move the player's PT boat, but there is an additional vertical element as the boat moves up and down with the large ocean waves that scroll beneath it. The direction and speed of the waves vary per level.

Prior to Wavy Navy, McAuley wrote several Apple II games for Creative Computing magazine.

Gameplay

The core enemies are planes grouped in a formation, similar to Galaxian, that break off and dive at the player's boat. Other flying enemies are machine gun-equipped helicopters, Exocet missiles, and bomb-dropping jets. The helicopters take the place of the flagships in Galaxian, sitting atop the rows of planes. Mines also appear in the water.

Completing a round by destroying all attackers awards 50 points for each PT boat remaining.

Reception
Owen Linzmayer, writing for Creative Computing Video & Arcade Games, rated the game "Excellent" and called the graphics "superbly done." A review of the Atari 8-bit version in Videogaming and Computergaming Illustrated began, "This one might well be called Galaga meets Moon Patrol on the high seas." Reviewing the Commodore 64 version, Ahoy! magazine wrote: "Sirius has succeeded where others have failed in working new wrinkles into the slide-and-shoot format."

In an Antic review, David Faughn noted the similarities to Galaxian and cautioned not buying Wavy Navy if you already own that game. Michael Blanchet, for Electronic Fun with Computers & Games, asked "How long does Sirius, or any software company for that matter, think the gaming public wants to play silly rehashes of Space Invaders?" and "are video game designers devoid of imagination?"

References

External links
Wavy Navy at Atari Mania

 (original Apple II version)

1983 video games
Apple II games
Atari 8-bit family games
Commodore 64 games
Fixed shooters
Naval video games
Sirius Software games
Video games developed in the United States